Clyde is an extinct town in Bryan County, in the U.S. state of Georgia.

History
Clyde once held the county seat of Bryan County. The community was named after Field Marshal Colin Campbell, 1st Baron Clyde (1792–1863), a Scottish soldier. A variant name was "Eden". A post office called Clyde was established in 1887, and remained in operation until 1941.

References

Geography of Bryan County, Georgia
Ghost towns in Georgia (U.S. state)